RTV USK or Radio Televizija Unsko-sanskog kantona is a Bosnian public television channel founded by Assembly of Una-Sana Canton. Local public radio station Radio USK is also part of this company.

Headquarters of RTV USK is located in the City of Bihać. The program is mainly produced in Bosnian language. 
RTV USK is the regional broadcaster (founded in 1995) that has modern equipment for broadcasting radio and television programs, as well as audio and video production. TV shows also promote multiculturalism and specific culture, tradition and customs characteristic for this region of Bosnia and Herzegovina.

Thanks to TV shows from its own production, RTVUSK programming becomes recognizable and widely viewed television station in the Bosanska Krajina area (Bihać, Cazin, Velika Kladuša, Bužim, Prijedor, Sanski Most, Bosanski Novi, Bosanska Krupa, Ključ, Bosanski Petrovac, Mrkonjić Grad). Estimated number of viewers population is about 430.456.

RTV USK is also member of the Bosnian television network called TV1Mreža.

Mreža TV is a television program with almost national coverage in Bosnia and Herzegovina, and jointly in partnership with O Kanal broadcast several regional public and private TV stations. Mreža TV airs popular series, movies and sports programs to viewers in BiH.

After the closure of the local public television channel "037TV" (television of the  Bihać municipality), RTV USK is a in agreement with the Bihać Municipal Council took their broadcasting equipment.

Current line-up
This television channel broadcasts a variety of programs such as news, talk shows, documentaries, sports, movies, mosaic, children's programs, etc.

 Dnevnik RTVUSK - main news programme (every night at 19:00h)
 Vijesti RTVUSK  - news at 10:00h, 12:00h and 14:30h
 U fokusu - (In Focus) political talk show (live) about actual events in the Una-Sana Canton and Bosnia and Herzegovina.
 Hronika krajških gradova - (Cities Chronicle) news from the largest cities in the Bosanska Krajina region produced by NTV 101
 Eko kviz - (Eco Quiz) educational quiz show dedicated to protecting the environment and nature.
 Duhovni svijet - (The spiritual world) religious programme (for all confessions) that presents latest news and events in the local religious communities  
 Kultura - (Culture) weekly review of current cultural events in the Una-Sana Canton
 TV Škola - (TV school) Children's program for pupils, parents and teachers.
 Moje dijete, savjetovalište za roditelje - (My child, advisory centre) educational TV programme for parents
 Timeout - TV show for teenagers
 Tragom sudbine - (Destiny) TV shows dedicated to life stories of ordinary citizens
 Sportska hronika - (Sports Chronicle) TV shows dedicated to local sports news
 USK nogomet - (USK Football) sports program dedicated to football
 Nedjeljom zajedno - (Sundays together) entertainment / collage program broadcast on Sunday afternoon    
 Turistički putokaz - (Tourist signs) - TV show about tourism
 Auto shop magazin - TV show dedicated to news from the auto industry

Previously broadcast
 Živjeti zdravo - magazine about health, herbs, beauty and wellness
 Poduzetnik - TV show about the economy
 Priče sa Une - documentary TV shows about the Una River
 Krajiška zemlja - program about agriculture in the Una-Sana Canton
 Eko kutak - program about environmental protection issues
 TV Aukcija - charity program
 Razgovor s povodom - talk show

References

External links
 www.rtvusk.ba (Official Website)
 RTV USK in Facebook 
 RTV USK in YouTube 
 Communications Regulatory Agency of Bosnia and Herzegovina

Television stations in Bosnia and Herzegovina
Television channels and stations established in 1995